Ibn Babawayh cemetery ( or ), also spelled as Ebn-e Babviyeh, Ebn-e Babooyeh, is located in Iran in the town of Rey (which is now inside Greater Tehran metropolitan area).

About 
The cemetery is named after the most famous occupant, Ibn Babawayh (d.991 CE) a scholar of Shia Islam. He taught in Baghdad and lived in Rey at the end of his life. His works (more than 300 volumes) are used as valid sources in Jurisprudence. His most famous book is Man La-yahzar al-faqih. He died in 381 A.H. and his tomb is in Ebn-e Babooyeh.

Many Iranian giants of sports, literature, arts, culture, religion, and politics are buried there. The reason for this is Rey being a Shiite pilgrimage site because of the Shah-Abdol-Azim shrine, which led many pious people to be buried near to this place.

Notable graves 
 Ibn Babawayh (d. 991) – medieval scholar
 Tughril (900–1063) – founder of the Seljuk Empire (Tughrul Tower)
 Abdolbaghi Monajjembashi (fa) (d. 1859) – politician
 Vahdat Kermanshahi (fa) (1825–1883) – poet
 Gholamreza Esfahani (fa) (1830–1887) – calligrapher
 Abolhassan Jelveh (fa) (1823–1897) – mystic
 Mohammad-Taher Mirza (fa) (b. 1835) – Qajar prince and scholar
 Mohammad-Hossein Foroughi Zoka ol-Molk (fa) (1839–1907) – politician
 Mohammad Kermanshahi (fa) (1827–1908) – physician
 Abulfazl Angha (fa) (1850–1915) – Sufi leader
 Hossein Ardabili (1880–1918) – politician
 Mohammad-Bagher Khosravi Kermanshahi (fa) (1849–1919) – writer
 Fazlollah Aq-Evli (fa) (1886–1920) – Gendermerie officer
 Mirzadeh Eshghi (1894–1924) – journalist
 Ali-Naghi Ganjei (fa) (1872–1929) – politician
 Yahya Marvasti (fa) (1875–1929) – politician
 Yahya Kashani (fa) (1873–1930) – journalist
 Parvaneh (Batoul Rezaei) (fa) (1910–1933) – singer
 Ashrafeddin Gilani (1870–1934) – journalist and poet
 Asadollah Kharaqani (fa) (1838–1936) – scholar
 Firouz Nosrat od-Dowleh III (1889–1937) – politician
 Fathollah Khan Akbar (1855–1938) – prime minister (1920–21)
 Hadi Tajvidi (fa) (1893–1939) – writer
 Mohammad-Ali Foroughi (1877–1942) – scholar and prime minister (1925–26), (1933–35) and (1941–42)
 Hassan Razzaz (fa) (1878–1942) – wrestler
 Karim Rashti (fa) (d. 1944) – politician
 Fasihozzaman Shirazi (fa) (1861–1945) – poet
 Hassan Esfandiari (1867–1945) – speaker of the Majles (1935–43)
 Fatemeh Sayyah (fa) (1902–1947) – scholar
 Abdol-Razzaq Baghayeri (fa) (1869–1953) – scholar
 Hossein Samiei (1876–1953) – politician
 Hossein Fatemi (1918–1954) – politician
 Fakhr od-Dowleh Qajar (1883–1955) – Qajar princess
 Abdollah Razi (fa) (1894–1955) – writer
 Ali-Akbar Dehkhoda (1879–1956) – journalist and scholar
 Mohammad-Sadegh Koupal (fa) (1893–1956) – IIAF general
 Ahmad Bahar (1889–1957) – politician
 Roshanak Noedoust (fa) (1898–1957) – journalist
 Mohammad-Ali Eghbal (fa) (d. 1958) – politician
 Ebrahim Hakimi (1871–1959) – prime minister (1945–46) and (1947–48)
 Hossein Kouhi Kermani (fa) (1897–1959) – poet
 Amir Amir-Alam (fa) (1876–1961) – politician and director of Red Lion and Sun Society
 Rajab-Ali Khayat (fa) (1883–1961) – mystic
 Mohammad-Hassan Shamshiri (1897–1961) – businessman
 Hadi Ranji Tehrani (fa) (1907–1961) – poet
 Javad Fazel Larijani (fa) (1916–1961) – writer
 Mahvash (Masumeh Azizi Boroujerdi) (1920–1961) – singer
 Abolhassan Khanali (fa) (1932–1961) – scholar
 Mohammad Shahbakhti (fa) (1886–1962) – army general
 Mahmoud Mahmoud (1882–1965) – writer
 Parkhideh (Nourolhoda Mozaffari) (fa) (1913–1965) – actor
 Sadeq Amani (1930–1965) – terrorist
 Morteza Niknejad (1942–1965) – terrorist
 Mohammad Bokharaei (1944–1965) – terrorist
 Reza Saffar Harandi (1946–1965) – terrorist
 Jabbar Baghtcheban (1886–1966) – scholar
 Ali Heyat (fa) (1888–1966) – politician
 Fakhr-e-Ozma Arghun (fa) (1898–1966) – poet
 Hossein Behzad (1894–1968) – painter
 Gholamreza Takhti (1930–1968) – wrestler
 Rokneddin Mokhtari (1887–1970) – head of National Police and musician
 Abdollah Moazzami (1909–1971) – politician
 Ahmad Nazerzadeh Kermani (fa) (1913–1976) – poet
 Morshed Cheloyi (fa) (d. 1978) – mystic
 Ali-Akbar Derakhshani (fa) (1896–1978) – army general
 Nasser Moghaddam (1921–1979) – army general and head of SAVAK
 Mohammad-Reza Ameli Tehrani (1927–1979) – politician
 Gholam-Hossein Minbashian (fa) (1907–1980) – musician
 Asadollah Rashidian (1922–1980) – politician
 Sadegh Ghotbzadeh (1936–1982) – politician
 Mohsen Foroughi (fr) (1907–1983) – architect
 Mohammad-Ali Riazi Yazdi (fa) (1911–1984) – poet
 Abol-Qasem Payandeh (fa) (1911–1984) – writer
 Khoshdel Tehrani (fa) (1914–1986) – poet
 Heydar Reghabi (fa) (1933–1987) – poet
 Kazem Sami (1934–1988) – politician
 Abbas Yamini Sharif (fa) (1919–1989) – scholar
 Mehdi Khaledi (fa) (1919–1990) – musician
 Hassan Sadat Naseri (fa) (1925–1990) – scholar
 Ataollah Zahed (fa) (1915–1991) – actor
 Mohammad Mohit Tabatabaei (fa) (1901–1992) – scholar
 Gholamhossein Sadighi (1905–1992) – politician
 Ghanbar Rahimi (fa) (1918–1992) – philanthropist
 Abol-Qasem Anjavi Shirazi (fa) (1921–1993) – scholar
 Hadi Eslami (fa) (1939–1993) – actor
 Ahmad Hashemi (fa) (1939–1993) – actor
 Ali-Akbar Kaveh (fa) (1894–1990) – calligrapher
 Ali-Akbar Ghaffari (fa) (1924–2004) – writer
 Rahim Moazzenzadeh Ardabili (1925–2005) – moazzen
 Mehdi Dadpey (fa) (1940–2019) – air force general

Gallary

References

External links
 

Cemeteries in Tehran
Cemeteries in Iran
Shia cemeteries
Buildings and structures in Tehran Province